Billy Wease (born October 9, 1986 in Noblesville, Indiana) is a driver in USAC. He was a development driver for Penske Racing in the mid 2000s. Wease was also the 2006 Turkey Night Grand Prix winner, and a four-time starter of the Little 500.

He also competed in two ARCA Re/Max Series races and failed to qualify to one, all of them for Penske Racing. His best finish was 2nd.

References

External links

Billy Wease at DriverDB

 

Living people
1986 births
People from Noblesville, Indiana
Racing drivers from Indiana
Racing drivers from Indianapolis
ARCA Menards Series drivers
USAC Silver Crown Series drivers